The Robert Schofield House is located in Greenwood, Wisconsin.

History
Robert Schofield was a lumberman and farmer. Among the features of the house are an oak and mahogany elliptical-spiralled staircase and original carbide-glass chandeliers. The house was listed on the National Register of Historic Places in 1982 and on the State Register of Historic Places in 1989.

References

Houses on the National Register of Historic Places in Wisconsin
National Register of Historic Places in Clark County, Wisconsin
Houses in Clark County, Wisconsin
Italianate architecture in Wisconsin